Lovington Municipal Schools is a school district headquartered in Lovington, New Mexico.

The district is entirely in Lea County and includes Lovington. As of 2020 it had the second highest enrollment of any Lea County school district.

History
From 2019 to 2020 the district's enrollment fell by 300 students. One factor was restrictions in New Mexico during the COVID-19 pandemic in New Mexico, while Texas schools at the time lacked such restrictions. 

LeAnne Gandy served as superintendent until 2022. The position then opened to Pam Quinones, the previous principal of Lovington High School.

Schools
 High schools
 Lovington High School (10-12)
 Freshman Academy (9)
 New Hope High School (Alternative 9–12)

 Middle schools
 Taylor Middle School (grades 7–8)
 Sixth Grade Academy

 Elementary schools
 Yarbro Elementary School (grades 4–5)
 Jefferson Elementary School (grade 3)
 Ben Alexander Elementary School (grade 2)
 Lea Elementary School (grade 1)
 Llano Elementary School (Pre-Kindergarten and Kindergarten)

Notable Alumni

Brian Urlacher

References

External links
 Lovington Municipal Schools

School districts in New Mexico
Education in Lea County, New Mexico